My Anthem: Sympathetic Resonance (stylized as my anthem -sympathetic resonance-) is the remix album to Yoshika's debut album, My Anthem. The album was predominantly EDM. The album failed to chart on Oricon.

Track listing
(Track list)

CD
"All I Do [KAI & KYLE Remix]"
"Time After Time [ALBNOTE Remix]"
"My Anthem [ALBNOTE Remix]"
"Natural Lady [DJ KAWASAKIE vs MAKOTO Remix]"
"Thriller [SEIKOU NAKAOKA Remix]"
"I Dream [TAO OF SOUND Remix]"
"Mama Used To Say [tangerine. Remix]"
"A Long Walk [miu-clips Remix]"
"The Glow of Love [M-SWIFT feat. 24-CARAT Remix]"
"I Dream [MAKOTO'S 80s LEGACY REMIX ~Long Verson~]"
"Right Here ~HUMAN NATURE REMIX~ [ROOT SOUL Remix]"
"All I Want Is U [DJ KOMORI Remix]"
"Change the World [DAISUKE OSHIMA Remix]"

References

2014 remix albums
Avex Group remix albums